Holcot is a village and civil parish in the West Northamptonshire in England. At the time of the 2001 census, the parish's population was 399 people. At the 2011 census this had increased to 438 people, living in 182 households.

The villages name means 'Cottages in the hollows'.

Notable buildings
The Historic England website contains details of a total of ten listed buildings in the parish of Holcot, all of which are Grade II except for St Mary and All Saints’ Church which is Grade I. They are:
St Mary and All Saints' Church, Main Street
Polly's Cottage, Back Lane
War Memorial, Back Lane
The Old Rectory, Brixworth Road
Churchyard Cross, Main Street
Hollybush Farmhouse, Poplar Lane
Poplar Farm, Poplar Lane
Manor House, Rectory Lane
Brook Cottage & Wall Dene, Sywell Road
Ivy House, Sywell Road

See also  
  Robert Holcot (born in Holcot)

References

External links

Village website http://www.holcotvillage.co.uk

Villages in Northamptonshire
West Northamptonshire District